The 2006–07 New Jersey Devils season was the 33rd season for the National Hockey League franchise that was established on June 11, 1974, and 25th season since the franchise relocated from Colorado prior to the 1982–83 NHL season. The team qualified again for the Stanley Cup playoffs, losing in the second round to the Ottawa Senators.

Pre-season

Regular season
The 2006–07 season saw the team attempting to maintain its position among the top teams in the National Hockey League's Eastern Conference. Behind the goaltending of Martin Brodeur and the offensive abilities of players such as Patrik Elias, Scott Gomez and Brian Gionta, the Devils once again made a drive into the playoffs. It was the team's last season in Continental Airlines Arena in East Rutherford, New Jersey, as construction of the Prudential Center in Newark was completed in time for the Devils to move in for the 2007–08 season. Patrik Elias became the seventh captain in team history, following the retirement of Scott Stevens the previous season.

Brodeur, in his 13th full season of NHL play, continued his legacy as one of the winningest goaltenders in league history. On December 8, he shut out the Philadelphia Flyers to record his 462nd career victory, moving him into second place on the all-time victory list, behind Patrick Roy (551). Later in the month, on December 26, Brodeur recorded his 85th career shutout (3–0 over the Pittsburgh Penguins) to move into third place on the all-time shutout list, behind Terry Sawchuk (103) and George Hainsworth (94).

On April 2, the Devils surprisingly fired head coach Claude Julien with three games remaining in the season, despite a strong record of 47–24–8. Lou Lamoriello took over as coach afterwards.

On April 5, 2007, a win against the Philadelphia Flyers broke two records. One was the records for most wins in a season by a goaltender by Martin Brodeur with his 48th victory of the season. However, nine of those wins came via shootout. Making all things equivalent, Brodeur finished the season with 39 non-shootout wins to Bernie Parent's 47. The other being the New Jersey Devil franchise record of most wins by the team in a season with their 49th victory.

The Devils finished the regular season as Atlantic Division champions with 107 points, good for second place in the Eastern Conference. They also finished the regular season with a league-high 12 shutouts, all by Martin Brodeur.

The Devils were the most disciplined team during the regular season, with just 271 power-play opportunities against, and allowed the fewest power-play goals in the NHL, with only 40.

Season standings

Game log 

|- style="background-color:#bbffbb"
| 1 || October 6 || New Jersey || 4 - 0 || Carolina || || Brodeur || 18,649 || 1-0-0 || 2
|- style="background-color:#ffbbbb"
| 2 || October 7 || New Jersey || 1 - 3 || Dallas || || Brodeur || 18,532 || 1-1-0 || 2
|- style="background-color:#bbffbb"
| 3 || October 12 || Toronto || 6 - 7 || New Jersey || SO || Brodeur || 15,623 || 2-1-0 || 4
|- style="background-color:#bbffbb"
| 4 || October 14 || Philadelphia || 2 - 3 || New Jersey || || Brodeur || 14,177 || 3-1-0 || 6
|- style="background-color:#ffbbbb"
| 5 || October 16 || New Jersey || 2 - 4 || NY Rangers || || Brodeur || 18,200 || 3-2-0 || 6
|- style="background-color:#bbffbb"
| 6 || October 18 || New Jersey || 2 - 1 || Pittsburgh || || Brodeur || 17,030 || 4-2-0 || 8
|- style=""
| 7 || October 19 || Nashville || 4 - 3 || New Jersey || SO || Clemmensen || 11,274 || 4-2-1 || 9
|- style="background-color:#ffbbbb"
| 8 || October 21 || New Jersey || 1 - 8 || Ottawa || || Brodeur || 19,166 || 4-3-1 || 9
|- style="background-color:#ffbbbb"
| 9 || October 24 || New Jersey || 2 - 4 || Pittsburgh || || Brodeur || 13,190 || 4-4-1 || 9
|- style="background-color:#bbffbb"
| 10 || October 26 || Florida || 0 - 2 || New Jersey || || Brodeur || 11,594 || 5-4-1 || 11
|- style="background-color:#bbffbb"
| 11 || October 28 || Columbus || 0 - 1 || New Jersey || || Brodeur || 14,015 || 6-4-1 || 13

|- style="background-color:#ffbbbb"
| 12 || November 2 || NY Islanders || 5 - 2 || New Jersey || || Brodeur || 8,269 || 6-5-1 || 13
|- style="background-color:#bbffbb"
| 13 || November 4 || New Jersey || 2 - 1 || Montreal || || Brodeur || 21,273 || 7-5-1 || 15
|- style="background-color:#bbffbb"
| 14 || November 7 || Carolina || 2 - 3 || New Jersey || SO || Brodeur || 10,986 || 8-5-1 || 17
|- style="background-color:#bbffbb"
| 15 || November 9 || Chicago || 1 - 2 || New Jersey || SO || Brodeur || 10,978 || 9-5-1 || 19
|- style="background-color:#bbffbb"
| 16 || November 11 || Florida || 2 - 4 || New Jersey || || Brodeur || 14,112 || 10-5-1 || 21
|- style="background-color:#ffbbbb"
| 17 || November 14 || New Jersey || 2 - 3 || NY Rangers || || Brodeur || 18,200 || 10-6-1 || 21
|- style="background-color:#bbffbb"
| 18 || November 17 || Ottawa || 2 - 3 || New Jersey || || Brodeur || 15,133 || 11-6-1 || 23
|- style="background-color:#bbffbb"
| 19 || November 18 || New Jersey || 2 - 1 || Toronto || || Brodeur || 19,409 || 12-6-1 || 25
|- style="background-color:#ffbbbb"
| 20 || November 22 || New Jersey || 1 - 3 || Phoenix || || Brodeur || 12,883 || 12-7-1 || 25
|- style="background-color:#ffbbbb"
| 21 || November 24 || New Jersey || 2 - 4 || Anaheim || || Brodeur || 16,599 || 12-8-1 || 25
|- style="background-color:#ffbbbb"
| 22 || November 25 || New Jersey || 0 - 2 || San Jose || || Brodeur || 17,496 || 12-9-1 || 25
|- style=""
| 23 || November 27 || New Jersey || 2 - 3 || Los Angeles || SO || Brodeur || 16,223 || 12-9-2 || 26

|- style="background-color:#bbffbb"
| 24 || December 1 || Pittsburgh || 2 - 5 || New Jersey || || Brodeur || 13,890 || 13-9-2 || 28
|- style="background-color:#bbffbb"
| 25 || December 2 || New Jersey || 4 - 3 || Philadelphia || SO || Brodeur || 19,559 || 14-9-2 || 30
|- style="background-color:#bbffbb"
| 26 || December 6 || Montreal || 1 - 2 || New Jersey || OT || Brodeur || 10,986 || 15-9-2 || 32
|- style="background-color:#bbffbb"
| 27 || December 8 || Philadelphia || 0 - 2 || New Jersey || || Brodeur || 14,003 || 16-9-2 || 34
|- style="background-color:#bbffbb"
| 28 || December 9 || New Jersey || 5 - 1 || Boston || || Brodeur || 13,476 || 17-9-2 || 36
|- style="background-color:#ffbbbb"
| 29 || December 12 || Buffalo || 3 - 2 || New Jersey || || Brodeur || 11,156 || 17-10-2 || 36
|- style="background-color:#ffbbbb"
| 30 || December 14 || New Jersey || 3 - 5 || Boston || || Clemmensen || 11,121 || 17-11-2 || 36
|- style="background-color:#ffbbbb"
| 31 || December 16 || Detroit || 2 - 1 || New Jersey || || Brodeur || 15,078 || 17-12-2 || 36
|- style="background-color:#bbffbb"
| 32 || December 17 || New Jersey || 6 - 1 || NY Rangers || || Brodeur || 18,200 || 18-12-2 || 38
|- style=""
| 33 || December 19 || Atlanta || 4 - 3 || New Jersey || SO || Brodeur || 10,116 || 18-12-3 || 39
|- style="background-color:#bbffbb"
| 34 || December 22 || New Jersey || 4 - 1 || Washington || || Brodeur || 13,744 || 19-12-3 || 41
|- style="background-color:#ffbbbb"
| 35 || December 23 || New Jersey || 2 - 5 || Atlanta || || Brodeur || 17,548 || 19-13-3 || 41
|- style="background-color:#bbffbb"
| 36 || December 26 || Pittsburgh || 0 - 3 || New Jersey || || Brodeur || 16,156 || 20-13-3 || 43
|- style="background-color:#bbffbb"
| 37 || December 29 || Washington || 3 - 4 || New Jersey || || Brodeur || 16,297 || 21-13-3 || 45
|- style="background-color:#bbffbb"
| 38 || December 30 || New Jersey || 2 - 0 || NY Islanders || || Brodeur || 16,234 || 22-13-3 || 47

|- style=""
| 39 || January 2 || NY Rangers || 3 - 2 || New Jersey || SO || Brodeur || 17,759 || 22-13-4 || 48
|- style="background-color:#bbffbb"
| 40 || January 4 || NY Islanders || 3 - 4 || New Jersey || || Brodeur || 12,529 || 23-13-4 || 50
|- style="background-color:#bbffbb"
| 41 || January 6 || New Jersey || 3 - 2 || Ottawa || || Brodeur || 19,548 || 24-13-4 || 52
|- style="background-color:#bbffbb"
| 42 || January 7 || New Jersey || 3 - 0 || Montreal || || Brodeur || 21,273 || 25-13-4 || 54
|- style="background-color:#ffbbbb"
| 43 || January 10 || St. Louis || 3 - 2 || New Jersey || || Brodeur || 16,337 || 25-14-4 || 54
|- style="background-color:#bbffbb"
| 44 || January 12 || Atlanta || 1 - 2 || New Jersey || || Brodeur || 13,249 || 26-14-4 || 56
|- style="background-color:#bbffbb"
| 45 || January 13 || New Jersey || 2 - 1 || NY Islanders || OT || Brodeur || 16,234 || 27-14-4 || 58
|- style="background-color:#bbffbb"
| 46 || January 16 || NY Rangers || 0 - 1 || New Jersey || || Brodeur || 18,096 || 28-14-4 || 60
|- style=""
| 47 || January 18 || Tampa Bay || 3 - 2 || New Jersey || SO || Brodeur || 12,698 || 28-14-5 || 61
|- style="background-color:#bbffbb"
| 48 || January 20 || Philadelphia || 3 - 4 || New Jersey || SO || Brodeur || 16,621 || 29-14-5 || 63
|- style="background-color:#bbffbb"
| 49 || January 26 || New Jersey || 2 - 0 || Tampa Bay || || Brodeur || 21,404 || 30-14-5 || 65
|- style="background-color:#ffbbbb"
| 50 || January 27 || New Jersey || 2 - 4 || Florida || || Brodeur || 18,136 || 30-15-5 || 65
|- style=""
| 51 || January 30 || New Jersey || 4 - 5 || Atlanta || SO || Brodeur || 12,162 || 30-15-6 || 66 

|- style="background-color:#bbffbb"
| 52 || February 1 || New Jersey || 6 - 5 || Philadelphia || OT || Brodeur || 19,427 || 31-15-6 || 68
|- style="background-color:#bbffbb"
| 53 || February 3 || Buffalo || 2 - 3 || New Jersey || || Brodeur || 18,589 || 32-15-6 || 70
|- style="background-color:#bbffbb"
| 54 || February 6 || NY Rangers || 2 - 3 || New Jersey || SO || Brodeur || 16,290 || 33-15-6 || 72
|- style="background-color:#bbffbb"
| 55 || February 8 || NY Islanders || 0 - 2 || New Jersey || || Brodeur || 10,110 || 34-15-6 || 74
|- style="background-color:#ffbbbb"
| 56 || February 11 || Tampa Bay || 4 - 1 || New Jersey || || Brodeur || 18,022 || 34-16-6 || 74
|- style="background-color:#bbffbb"
| 57 || February 14 || Montreal || 2 - 5 || New Jersey || || Brodeur || 7,515 || 35-16-6 || 76
|- style="background-color:#ffbbbb"
| 58 || February 16 || Pittsburgh || 5 - 4 || New Jersey || || Brodeur || 15,404 || 35-17-6 || 76 
|- style="background-color:#bbffbb"
| 59 || February 17 || New Jersey || 2 - 0 || NY Islanders || || Brodeur || 15,223  || 36-17-6 || 78 
|- style="background-color:#bbffbb"
| 60 || February 20 || NY Rangers || 1 - 2 || New Jersey || || Brodeur || 18,537 || 37-17-6 || 80
|- style="background-color:#bbffbb"
| 61 || February 22 || New Jersey || 3 - 2 || NY Rangers || || Brodeur || 18,200  || 38-17-6 || 82
|- style="background-color:#ffbbbb"
| 62 || February 24 || Washington || 4 - 2 || New Jersey || || Brodeur || 14,301 || 38-18-6 || 82
|- style="background-color:#bbffbb"
| 63 || February 25 || New Jersey || 3 - 2 || Washington || || Clemmensen || 14,585 || 39-18-6 || 84
|- style="background-color:#bbffbb"
| 64 || February 27 || New Jersey || 1 - 0 || Pittsburgh || || Brodeur || 17,006 || 40-18-6 || 86

|- style=""
| 65 || March 2 || Toronto || 4 - 3 || New Jersey || SO || Brodeur || 15,095 || 40-18-7 || 87
|- style="background-color:#ffbbbb"
| 66 || March 4 || Boston || 4 - 1 || New Jersey ||  || Brodeur || 14,254 || 40-19-7 || 87
|- style=""
| 67 || March 6 || New Jersey || 4 - 5 || Philadelphia || OT || Brodeur || 19,210 || 40-19-8 || 88
|- style="background-color:#bbffbb"
| 68 || March 8 || New Jersey || 4 - 3 || Pittsburgh || SO || Brodeur || 17,132 || 41-19-8 || 90
|- style="background-color:#bbffbb"
| 69 || March 10 || New Jersey || 3 - 2 || Buffalo || || Brodeur || 18,690 || 42-19-8 || 92
|- style="background-color:#ffbbbb"
| 70 || March 14 || Pittsburgh || 3 - 0 || New Jersey || || Brodeur || 14,862 || 42-20-8 || 92
|- style="background-color:#bbffbb"
| 71 || March 15 || New Jersey || 3 - 2 || Carolina || || Brodeur || 18,279 || 43-20-8 || 94
|- style="background-color:#ffbbbb"
| 72 || March 17 || Carolina || 7 - 2 || New Jersey || || Brodeur || 15,490  || 43-21-8 || 94
|- style="background-color:#ffbbbb"
| 73 || March 20 || New Jersey || 1 - 2 || Toronto || || Brodeur || 19,518 || 43-22-8 || 94
|- style="background-color:#ffbbbb"
| 74 || March 22 || New Jersey || 1 - 3 || Tampa Bay || || Brodeur || 20,326 || 43-23-8 || 94
|- style="background-color:#bbffbb"
| 75 || March 24 || New Jersey || 4 - 3 || Florida || SO || Brodeur || 16,101 || 44-23-8 || 96
|- style="background-color:#bbffbb"
| 76 || March 27 || New Jersey || 3 - 2 || NY Islanders ||  || Brodeur || 13,337  || 45-23-8 || 98
|- style="background-color:#ffbbbb"
| 77 || March 28 || New Jersey || 3 - 4 || Buffalo || || Brodeur || 18,690 || 45-24-8 || 98
|- style="background-color:#bbffbb"
| 78|| March 30 || Philadelphia || 1 - 3 || New Jersey || || Brodeur || 17,493 || 46-24-8 || 100

|- style="background-color:#bbffbb"
| 79 || April 1 || Boston || 1 - 3 || New Jersey ||  || Brodeur || 14,378 || 47-24-8 || 102
|- style="background-color:#bbffbb"
| 80 || April 3 || Ottawa || 1 - 2  || New Jersey || SO || Brodeur || 11,642 || 48-24-8 || 104 
|- style="background-color:#bbffbb"
| 81 || April 5 || New Jersey || 3 - 2 || Philadelphia ||  || Brodeur || 19,177 || 49-24-8 || 106
|- style=""
| 82 || April 8 || NY Islanders || 3 - 2 || New Jersey || SO || Clemmensen || 18,111 || 49-24-9 || 107

|-
| style="font-size:88%" |

Playoffs

The New Jersey Devils ended the 2006–07 regular season as the Eastern Conference's second seed.

On April 28, 2007 the Devils sold out the 19,040 capacity Continental Airlines Arena for the first time in the 2006–07 season in the 3–2 double overtime win against the Ottawa Senators.

The Devils' season came to an end on May 5, 2007, as they lost Game 5 of the Eastern Conference Semi-finals to the Ottawa Senators 3–2, to lose the series 4–1. That defeat turned out to be the last game ever played at the Continental Airlines Arena.

Eastern Conference Quarter-finals: vs. (7) Tampa Bay Lightning
New Jersey wins series 4–2

Eastern Conference Semi-finals: vs. (4) Ottawa Senators
Ottawa wins series 4–1

Green background indicates win.
Red background indicates loss.

Media
Television coverage was still on Fox Sports Network with Mike Emrick calling the play-by-play and Chico Resch serving the color commentator. Meanwhile, Steve Cangialosi handled the studio hosting duties. Radio coverage was still on WFAN 660, but this time, former television color commentator Matt Loughlin took the position as radio play-by-play announcer. Also, in this season, Sherry Ross returns to be the radio color commentator.

Player statistics

Regular season
Scoring

Goaltending

Playoffs
Scoring

Goaltending

Note: GP = Games played; G = Goals; A = Assists; Pts = Points; +/- = Plus/minus; PIM = Penalty minutes; PPG = Power-play goals; SHG = Short-handed goals; GWG = Game-winning goals
      MIN = Minutes played; W = Wins; L = Losses; T/OT = Ties/overtime losses; GA = Goals against; GAA = Goals against average; SO = Shutouts; SA = Shots against; SV = Shots saved; SV% = Save percentage;

Transactions

Trades

Free agents acquired

Free agents lost

Awards and records

Awards

Nominations

Draft picks
The Devils' picks at the 2006 NHL Entry Draft in Vancouver, British Columbia.

See also
2006–07 NHL season

Notes

References
Game log: New Jersey Devils game log on espn.com
Team standings: NHL standings on espn.com

New Jersey Devils seasons
New Jersey Devils
New Jersey Devils
New Jersey Devils
New Jersey Devils
21st century in East Rutherford, New Jersey
Meadowlands Sports Complex